Union Township is one of ten townships in Gibson County, Indiana. As of the 2010 census, its population was 4,197 and it contained 1,779 housing units, more than 90% of which live either within or in areas adjacent to the town of Fort Branch. Fort Branch is the township seat. Nearly all of the Toyota Motor Manufacturing Indiana Complex is located within Union Township.

Union Township was established in 1890.

Geography

Cities and towns
 Fort Branch

Unincorporated towns
 Durham (extinct)
 Fort Gibson (extinct)
 Snake Run

Adjacent townships
 Patoka Township (north)
 Center Township (northeast)
 Barton Township (east)
 Johnson Township (south)
 Montgomery Township (west)

Cemeteries
The township contains three cemeteries: Durham, Mount Mariah and Walnut Hill.

Major highways
  Interstate 69; Traverses the southeastern corner of the township
  U.S. Route 41; Bisects the township from south to north
 State Road 168; bisects the township from west to east.

Education
Union Township is the center of the South Gibson School Corporation.

Public schools
 Fort Branch Community School
 Gibson Southern High School

Higher Education
 Vincennes University Advanced Manufacturing Campus

Private schools
 Holy Cross Catholic Academy - Fort Branch

References
 U.S. Board on Geographic Names (GNIS)
 United States Census Bureau cartographic boundary files

External links
 Indiana Township Association
 United Township Association of Indiana

Townships in Gibson County, Indiana
Townships in Indiana